Sergey Budalov (born 7 August 1949) is a retired high jumper who represented the Soviet Union. Budalov trained at Spartak in Moscow Oblast. He finished fourth at the 1976 Olympic Games in Montreal and eighth at the 1971 European Indoor Championships in Sofia. On national level he became Soviet champion in high jump on three occasions, setting a new championship record of 2.25 metres in 1976.

References

Sports Reference

1949 births
Living people
Russian male high jumpers
Soviet male high jumpers
Budalov, Sergeyan
Olympic athletes of the Soviet Union
Spartak athletes